John Dugan is a retired American soccer player and coach who both played and coached professionally in the USL A-League.

Player
Dugan attended Virginia Commonwealth University, playing on the men’s soccer team from 1986 to 1990.  In 1992, he joined the Canton Invaders of the National Professional Soccer League.  In 1993, he moved to the Richmond Kickers in the USISL.  During the 1993–94 USISL indoor season, Dugan scored twenty-four goals in seven games, putting him second on the league’s points chart.  In the fall of 1994, Dugan returned to the Canton Invaders for a single season.  In 1998, he again played for the Kickers before finishing his playing career with the Raleigh Express in 1999.

Coach
In 1999, the Raleigh Capital Express hired Dugan as a player-assistant coach.  Midway through the season, he became head coach.  In 2001, he move to the Atlanta Silverbacks as head coach.  In 2003, he was the General Manager of the Richmond Kickers youth clubs.

References

Living people
American soccer players
American soccer coaches
Atlanta Silverbacks coaches
Canton Invaders players
National Professional Soccer League (1984–2001) players
Raleigh (Capital) Express players
Richmond Kickers players
USISL players
A-League (1995–2004) players
USL First Division coaches
VCU Rams men's soccer players
Year of birth missing (living people)
Place of birth missing (living people)
Association football midfielders
Association football forwards